Liao Shijun (born September 15, 1963) is a fluid mechanics and applied mathematics expert working in homotopy analysis method (HAM), nonlinear waves, nonlinear dynamics, and applied mathematics. He was born in Wuhan, Hubei Province, China. Liao is a professor at Shanghai Jiao Tong University.

External links
Liao's homepage
Advances in the Homotopy Analysis Method

Academic staff of Shanghai Jiao Tong University
Physicists from Hubei
1963 births
Living people
People from Wuhan
Educators from Hubei
Mathematicians from Hubei